The Ministry of Foreign Affairs of Yugoslavia was the ministry responsible for representing the Kingdom of Yugoslavia internationally from 1918 to 1941 and the Socialist Federal Republic of Yugoslavia from 1945 to 1992. It may also refer to the ministry which represented Serbia and Montenegro (officially named the Federal Republic of Yugoslavia between 1992 and 2003) from 1992 to 2006.

List of ministers

Kingdom of Yugoslavia (1918–1941)

Yugoslav government-in-exile (1941–1945)

National Committee for the Liberation of Yugoslavia (1943–1945) Национальный комитет освобождения Югославии

SFR Yugoslavia (1945–1992)
After the Communist Party of Yugoslavia took control of the country in 1945, most of the prewar ministers were removed from politics. Momčilo Ninčić, Bogoljub Jevtić, Milan Stojadinović, Slobodan Jovanović and Božidar Purić remained in exile. Miloš Trifunović, Milan Grol and Ivan Šubašić left politics.

FR Yugoslavia / Serbia and Montenegro (1992–2006)
Following the breakup of Yugoslavia and the secession of four out of six constituent republic in the SFR Yugoslavia the remaining two (Serbia and Montenegro) established a federation in 1992 called the Federal Republic of Yugoslavia (FR Yugoslavia). This lasted until 2003 when it was reconstituted as a political union called Serbia and Montenegro. In 2006 Montenegro declared independence and parted ways.

See also
Ministry of Foreign Affairs (Bosnia and Herzegovina)
Ministry of Foreign and European Affairs (Croatia)
Ministry of Foreign Affairs (Montenegro)
Ministry of Foreign Affairs (North Macedonia)
Ministry of Foreign Affairs (Serbia)
Ministry of Foreign Affairs (Slovenia)

References

External links
 List of ministers at mfa.rs
List of ministers at Rulers.org
Governments of the Kingdom of the Serbs, Croats & Slovenes (Yugoslavia) 1918–1945
 Lazić, Milorad. (20 March 2017). Yugoslavia is Gone, But Its Archives Remain. Woodrow Wilson International Center for Scholars.

Government of Yugoslavia
Yugoslavia
Foreign relations of Yugoslavia